Hraničná is a district of the town of Kraslice in Sokolov District, Czech Republic. It is situated between Kraslice the centre of Klingenthal along the border river Svatava in the west of the Erzgebirge.

History
The settlement emerged in 13th century and belonged to Waldsassen Abbey, which colonized the area. The German name of Markhausen derives from its position at a border (or, demarcation; German Mark (border); Hausen from German Haus(house), i.e. from the fact that there are houses at a border).

The first mention in official documents can be dated back to 1348. Successively, for roughly 250 years, the place does hardly appear historical documents.

In 1608, Markhausen was founded again and is mentioned in a 1715 map of the Elbogener Kreis by the minister cartographer Adam Friedrich Zürner. Back then, the settlement belonged to neighboring Krásná u Kraslic (German: Schönwerth). The inhabitants' economy based mainly upon forgecraft, the production of wood charcoal and mining.
In 1610, Markhausen became a Katastralgemeinde. In 1847, 302 people lived there in 32 houses, then living mainly from agriculture and lace production.

In 1930, Markhausen was an industrial community of 1252 inhabitants in 143 houses, of whom were 1162 Germans, 37 Czech and 54 from other origins. There was a 4-form school, the Hraničná auxiliary fire brigade a post office, a customs office, a Gendarmerie station, a cinema, a public open air bath a factory, many craftsmen and traders. Municipal life included six registered clubs and two musical bands, frequenting the eight pubs of the village. The terrific situation at the Saxon border secured vivid commercial transit and tourism. Guests especially headed for the pubs, which hosted concerts and dances frequently. The more famous localities were the "Brauner Hund" (German for Brown Dog), the "Schwarze Katz" (German for Black Cat) and the "Reichsgrenze" (German for Empire's Border)

In 1946, the German inhabitants were forcibly deported and Markhausen repopulated from within central Czechoslovakia. In 1947, "Hraničná" was given as its new name. In 1948, 220 inhabitants were counted. In 1955, the demolition of the village was started, to establish an uninhabited border strip. Until 1967 trespassing was strictly prohibited.

Following the Velvet Revolution, the advantageous position was reclaimed by two gas stations, three restaurants and a market area, including a number of shops for Asian raw foods, cigarettes and other commodities. The road between Klingenthal and Kraslice is free to use by automobiles up to 3,5 tons or up to 9 passengers and well-frequented. Also, a well-developed cycle track allows convenient tours.

Populated places in Sokolov District
Neighbourhoods in the Czech Republic
Former villages in the Czech Republic
Czech Republic–Germany border